Minding the Baby is a 1931 Fleischer Studios Talkartoon animated short film starring Betty Boop and Bimbo.

Synopsis
Bimbo's mom has fallen out with her husband and has had an affair with the ice man. Bimbo's mother goes shopping and leaves Bimbo in charge of his baby brother, Aloysius. Betty Boop wants Bimbo to come over to her house to play. Bimbo then sneaks over to Betty's. Aloysius misbehaves while Bimbo is over at Betty's apartment. Aloysius then uses a vacuum cleaner and vacuums Betty and Bimbo from next door and his mother from off the street. Bimbo's mother is furious, as Betty, Bimbo and Aloysius hide behind a chair in Bimbo's apartment. Aloysius starts to cry, Bimbo then zips his brother's mouth shut.

References

External links

Minding the Baby at the Cartoon Database

1931 films
Betty Boop cartoons
1930s American animated films
American black-and-white films
1931 animated films
Paramount Pictures short films
Fleischer Studios short films
Short films directed by Dave Fleischer
1931 comedy films
American comedy short films